Maddison is both a surname and a given name. It is a variant spelling of Madison. Notable people with the name include:

Surname:
 Ada Maddison (1869–1950), British Mathematician
 Adela Maddison (1862–1929), British composer
 Angus Maddison (1926–2010), British economist 
 Arden Maddison (1900–1987), English footballer
 Francis Maddison (1928–2006), English museum curator, historian and Arabist
 Fred Maddison (1856–1937), British trade unionist and politician
 Frederick Maddison (footballer) (1849–1907), English footballer 
 George Maddison (disambiguation), multiple people 
 Guy Maddison (born 1965), Australian bass guitar player
James Maddison (born 1996), English footballer
 John Maddison (1921–1982), Australian politician
 Ken Maddison (born 1946), Australian rugby league footballer
 Lee Maddison (born 1972), English professional association footballer
 Neil Maddison (born 1969), English footballer 
 Robbie Maddison (born 1981), Australian motorbike stunt rider
 Ronald Maddison (c. 1933 – 1953), Royal Air Force engineer 
 Sarah Maddison, Australian author 
 Tim Maddison, Australian rugby league footballer
 Wayne Maddison, an arachnologist
 William Maddison, British Olympic sailor

Given name:
 Maddison Bird (born 1994), Canadian figure skater 
 Maddison Elliott (born 1998), Australian Paralympic swimmer
 Maddison Gabriel (born 1994), Australian model 
 Maddison Hall (born 1964), Australian convicted of murder
 John Maddison Morton (1811–1891), English playwright
 Maddison Pearman (born 1996), Canadian Olympic Speed Skater

See also
 Madison (disambiguation)

English-language surnames
Patronymic surnames